The Professional Footballers' Association Women's Young Player of the Year (commonly referred to as PFA Young Player of the Year) is an annual award given to the player who is voted to have been the best of the year in English women's football. The award has been presented since the 2013–14 season and the winner is chosen by a vote amongst the members of the players' trade union, the Professional Footballers' Association (PFA).

The current holder is Lauren Hemp of Manchester City.

Winners
The women's award has been presented since 2014 while the men's PFA Players' Player of the Year has been awarded since 1974. The table below also indicates where the winning player also won one or more of the other major "player of the year" awards in English women's football, namely the PFA Women's Players' Player of the Year award.

Breakdown of winners

By country

By club

See also

 List of sports awards honoring women

References

External links
 

English women's football trophies and awards
Awards established in 2014
2014 establishments in England
Women's association football trophies and awards